is a Japanese table tennis video game developed and published by Quest for the Game Boy exclusively in Japan. It was released in Japan on August 31, 1990 and never saw a release in another territory, although the game was going to be published by Sammy in America. The game allows the player to either compete in a tournament or vs. mode against 8 nations.

References

1990 video games
Game Boy games
Game Boy-only games
Table_tennis_video_games
Japan-exclusive video games
Video games developed in Japan